Oh, the Mysterious is a South Korean television series starring Yoon Kyun-sang and Jung Hye-sung. It aired on SBS from November 27, 2017 to January 30, 2018 on Mondays and Tuesdays at 22:00 (KST) time slot for 40 episodes.

Synopsis
About a framed escapee turned fake police detective (Yoon Kyun-sang) taking down bad criminals and learns to uncover his true identity.

Cast

Main
 Yoon Kyun-sang as Kim Jong-sam/Oh Il-seung 
 A framed ex-convict and prison escapee who becomes a fake detective that becomes a part of Metropolitan Investigation Unit. He is smart and fast at what he does while being handsome and firm.
 Jung Hye-sung as Jin Jin-young
 An inspector of the investigation unit who is smart, athletic with an impressive performance record.

Supporting

Seoul Metropolitan Police Agency
 Kim Hee-won as Park Soo-chil
 Do Ki-seok as Kim Min-pyo
 Kang Shin-hyo as Kwon Dae-woong
 Choi Won-young as Jang Pil-seong
 Im Hyun-sik as Jo Man-seok

Institute for Future Economics
 Jun Gook-hwan as Lee Kwang-ho
 Kim Young-pil as Ahn Tae-jung

Food Company
 Yoon Yoo-sun as Kook Soo-ran
 Kim Hye-yoon as young Kook Soo-ran
 Park Sung-geun as Kwak Young-jae
 Oh Seung-hoon as Gi Myeon-jung
 Kim Dong-won as Baek Kyung

Others

 Jang Hyun-sung as Kang Cheol-gi
 Kwon Hwa-woon as Hyeon Jin-gyeom	
 Choi Hyo-eun as Kim-ji
 Jeon Sung-woo as Scab
 Kim Ye-jun as young Scab
 Kim Da-ye as Cha Eun-bi
 Ok Ye-rin as Young Cha Eun-bi
 Baek Eun-hye as Nurse
 Jeon Ye-seo as Han Cha-kyung
 Yoon Bok-in as Yoo Kwang-mi
 Choi Dae-hoon as Kim Yoon-soo
 Moon Woo-jin as Han Kang
 Jason Scott Nelson as Drug lord
 Jeon No-min as Jin Jung-gil
 Yoon Na-moo as Song Il-chun

Production
The series is directed by Shin Kyung-soo of Deep Rooted Tree (2011) and Six Flying Dragons (2015) and written by Lee Hyun-joo of School 2013 (2012).

Original soundtrack

Part 1

Part 2

Part 3

Ratings
 In the table below,  represent the lowest ratings and  represent the highest ratings.
 NR denotes that the series did not rank in the top 20 daily programs on that date.

Awards and nominations

International broadcast
 In Singapore and Malaysia, the series aired within 24 hours after its original South Korean broadcast on Sony One under the title Doubtful Victory.

References

External links
  
 
 

Seoul Broadcasting System television dramas
Korean-language television shows
2017 South Korean television series debuts
South Korean crime television series
2018 South Korean television series endings
Television series by RaemongRaein